The Chetyrekh is a river in Krasnoyarsk Krai, Russia. Its source is in the Byrranga Mountains. It flows across tundra regions into the Staritsa, a branch of the Pyasina that discharges into the Pyasina Bay of the Kara Sea north of the main mouth of the Pyasina.

The Chetyrekh freezes up in late September—early October and stays under the ice until June.
Formerly this river was known as Dolgiy Brod River, but its name was changed after the 1917 Russian Revolution.

References
William Barr, The Last Journey of Peter Tessem and Paul Knutsen, 1919.

Rivers of Krasnoyarsk Krai
Tributaries of the Pyasina